Botaniska trädgården (Swedish for "botanical garden") may refer to:

Botaniska trädgården (Gothenburg)
Botaniska trädgården (Lund)
Botaniska trädgården (Uppsala)